Ergalataxinae is a taxonomic subfamily of small to medium-sized predatory sea snails, marine gastropod mollusks within the family Muricidae, the rock snails.
In this subfamily, the aragonitic shell has 0–2 
varices.

Genera
The subfamily Ergalataxinae contains the following genera:

Azumamorula Emerson, 1968 (uncertain, may be a subgenus of Morula)
Bedevina Habe, 1946
Claremontiella Houart, Zuccon & Puillandre, 2019
Cronia H. Adams & A. Adams, 1853
Cytharomorula Kuroda, 1953
Daphnellopsis Schepman, 1913
Drupella Thiele, 1925
Ergalatax Iredale, 1931
†Janssenia Landau, Harzhauser, İslamoğlu & Silva, 2013
Lataxiena Jousseaume, 1883
Lauta Houart, Zuccon & Puillandre, 2019
Lindapterys Petuch, 1987
Maculotriton Dall, 1904
Morula Schumacher, 1817
Murichorda Houart, Zuccon & Puillandre, 2019
Muricodrupa Iredale, 1918
Oppomorus Iredale, 1937
Orania Pallary, 1900
Pascula Dall, 1908
Phrygiomurex Dall, 1904
Spinidrupa Habe & Kosuge, 1966
Tenguella Arakawa, 1965
Trachypollia Woodring, 1928
Usilla H. Adams & A. Adams, 1853
Uttleya Marwick, 1934

Genera brought into synonymy 

 Cumella Jousseaume, 1898: synonym of  Lataxiena Jousseaume, 1883
 Habromorula Houart, 1995: synonym of  Morula (Habromorula) Houart, 1995
 Morulina Dall, 1923: synonym of Morula Schumacher, 1817
 Roquesia Petuch, 2013: synonym of Colubraria Schumacher, 1817

Genera that have been treated as subgenera 
 Azumamorula as Morula (Azumamorula)
 Oppomorus as Morula (Oppomorus), re-raised to genus in 2013.
 Usilla as Cronia (Usilla)

The classification into this subfamily is doubtful for the genera Daphnellopsis Schepman, 1913; Lindapterys Petuch, 1987 Maculotriton Dall, 1904; and Uttleya Marwick, 1934

Taxonomy

The subfamily Ergalataxinae originally contained just four species: Bedevina birileffi, Ergalatax contracta, E. tokugawai, and Cytharomorula vexillum.  Later, genera Morula, Spinidrupa, Cronia, and Drupella were transferred from the Rapaninae (also called Thaidinae).  New species have been described, and genera split, leading to a subfamily of approximately 150 species in 20+ genera.

Molecular phylogeny
Gene-sequence analysis of four genes (cytochrome c oxidase subunit I, and three ribosomal RNA) from 52 Ergalataxine species showed three major clades, with four suprageneric sub-clades in the last: 
 Clade A: Tenguella, Muricodrupa, Claremontiella
 Clade B: Morula, Murichorda
 Clade C: Phrygiomurex, and: 
 Clade W: Lataxiena, Usilla, some Orania
 Clade X: Drupella; Cronia, Maculotriton, Ergalatax
 Clade Y: Oppomorus; Spinidrupa, Bedevina
 Clade Z: Cytharomorula, some Orania, Pascula, Lauta

Genetic material from Azumamorula, Daphnellopsis, Lindapterys, and Uttleya was not included.  Genus names above reflect later changes, such as Lauta parva for "Morula" parva, Claremontiella nodulosa for "Morula" nodulosa, and Murichorda for "Muricodrupa" fiscella and "Morula" rumphiusi.

Cronia, Maculotriton, and Ergalatax may prove to be a single species, in which case the name Cronia would have precedence.  If Ergalatax is subsumed into Cronia, this would impact the name of the Ergalataxinae.  Most Spinidrupa grouped with Bedevina (which has priority), but the type species S. euracantha was more basal to clade Y (only 12S rRNA sequence was available for the latter).  Orania is polyphyletic, but its type species was not included.

References

External links

 
Muricidae